The People's Commissariat for Military and Naval Affairs of the Soviet Union was the central body of military command and control of the Armed Forces of the Soviet Union from November 12, 1923, to March 15, 1934.

History
The People's Commissariat was formed from two independent People's Commissariats (for Military and for Naval Affairs of the Russian Socialist Federative Soviet Republic). Abolished in connection with the formation of the People's Commissariat of Defense of the Soviet Union.

People's Commissars
The People's Commissariat was headed by the People's Commissar; at various times in this position were:
Leon Trotsky – November 12, 1923 – January 26, 1925;
Mikhail Frunze – January 26 – October 31, 1925;
Clement Voroshilov – November 6, 1925 – June 20, 1934

References

External links
Alphabetical Index of Current Governing Unclassified Orders of the People's Commissariat for Military Affairs, the Revolutionary Military Council of the Republic, the Revolutionary Military Council of the Soviet Union and Circulars of the People's Commissariat for Military and Marine Affairs as of July 1, 1926 Leningrad: Publishing House of the Office of the People's Commissariat for Military and Naval Affairs and the Revolutionary Military Council of the Soviet Union, 1926. Part 2: The Personnel of the Red Army and the Military. Horse Composition. Training, Service and Life of the Red Army. Service of the Red Army. Contentment. Record Keeping, Accounting, Reporting and Control

Sources

People's Commissariat for Military and Naval Affairs of the Soviet Union
Former defence ministries
Military history of Russia